This glossary of physics is a list of definitions of terms and concepts relevant to physics, its sub-disciplines, and related fields, including mechanics, materials science, nuclear physics, particle physics, and thermodynamics. For more inclusive glossaries concerning related fields of science and technology, see Glossary of chemistry terms, Glossary of astronomy, Glossary of areas of mathematics, and Glossary of engineering.

A

B

C

D

E

F

G

H

I

J

K

L

M

N

O

P

Q

R

S

T

U

V

W

X

Y

Z

See also
Outline of physics
Index of physics articles
Glossary of areas of mathematics
Glossary of astronomy
Glossary of biology
Glossary of calculus
Glossary of chemistry terms
Glossary of engineering
Glossary of probability and statistics

References

Glossaries of science
Wikipedia glossaries using description lists